Space Quest V: Roger Wilco – The Next Mutation is a graphic adventure game released for MS-DOS on February 5, 1993.

Premise
Space Quest V is unusual in the series in that it is primarily a specific parody of Star Trek; while there are some references to other fiction movies, like Predator, Alien, and The Fly, the game never moves too far away from its primary target. Roger's new ship features a command bridge and several officers to whom he can give orders, and eventually adopts a facehugger mascot called Spike, who "isn't quite housebroken": he leaves puddles of caustic acid behind him wherever he goes.

Plot
The game starts with a dramatic opening and Roger mid-mission on his ship: he is then revealed to be playing in a flight simulator, shaped suspiciously like the Millennium Falcon, at the StarCon Academy. Roger cheats to pass an aptitude test, and he's then given his own command — the garbage scow SCS Eureka — which looks (and functions) like an oversized vacuum cleaner. (Eureka is also a brand of vacuum cleaners.) The game involves several small missions, similar to ones seen in typical Star Trek episodes. Some missions are:
 Roger is hunted, alone, on a jungle planet by W-D40, a homicidal gynoid (the apparent sister of Arnoid the Annihilator, an Arnold Schwarzenegger look-alike  from Space Quest III). The gynoid has an invisibility device and a laser very similar to the plasma caster of the Predator. Her ship also resembles a Klingon Bird of Prey. Roger is being pursued for failing to pay for his Labion Terror Beast mating whistle from Space Quest II (a continuity error also found in Space Quest III, as in the second game it is shown on the order form that the whistle is free).
 While visiting a "space bar", Roger must free his chief engineer Cliffy (a parody of Scotty from the original Star Trek) from the brig, where he ended up after starting a fight triggered when he overheard a rival ship's crewmember refer to the Eureka as a garbage scow.  This parodies the bar fight scene in the famous Trek episode "The Trouble with Tribbles"—except that in this case, as Roger points out, the Eureka actually is a garbage scow! This is parodied further when Roger, noticing a warning not to immerse his free pack of space monkeys which he got from a "salesbeast" in alcohol, places them in his drink, causing them to multiply indefinitely (although the "space monkeys" are significantly larger than the sea monkeys they are a parody of).
 At one point Roger is in the process of being teleported when a fly buzzes into the beam. The teleporter malfunctions, and  Roger ends up in a tiny fly body with a human head. He then must find a way to restore his body, while the fly, in Roger's body with a fly head, acts rather stupidly (even by Roger Wilco standards) and jumps into garbage piles. This is a parody of science fiction/horror movie The Fly.

Roger's son from the future saved him at the beginning of SQIV, and later he shows a hologram of Roger's son's mother. Roger meets this woman in SQV and must protect her, or else his son would not exist, and thus neither would Roger.

The main plot is to stop a mutagenic disease that is spreading through the galaxy by discovering its source, and fighting everyone that got infected. In the end, the disease infects the crew members of the SCS Goliath, the StarCon flagship, whose toupee-wearing commander, Raems T. Quirk (a rather blatant spoof of Captain James T. Kirk), subsequently attacks the Eureka. In the end, Roger sacrifices his ship to get rid of the plague - and suddenly, if temporarily, becomes the commander of the fleet's flagship.

Roger is presented in a more positive light than usual. He's still a bungler and flies a ship that's falling apart at the seams, but along the adventure he gains the genuine respect of his crew and gets the girl in the end.

Development
This game was the first in the series not designed by the "Two Guys from Andromeda", as only Mark Crowe worked on the project. It was also the first Space Quest game that wasn't developed in-house by Sierra On-Line, but instead by Sierra's sister company, Dynamix, to which Mark Crowe had relocated shortly after the release of Space Quest IV.

Space Quest V was also the only Space Quest game, and the second Sierra title overall (Leisure Suit Larry 5 was the first) to be sponsored by a real-life company.  The logo for Sprint would appear following any communications transmissions, appear on a billboard in the Spacebar, and also appear in the ending credits.  Additionally, at one point in the game, there is a dialogue between two people where one denounces MCI's "Friends & Aliens" plan as "just not worth it." Space Quest V was one of several Sierra games given away as a reward for signing up for service with Sprint. There is also a mention of "TT&A".

Although this game came after the CD-ROM "talkie" version of Space Quest IV, it was originally released on floppy disks only (although it would later be released on a compilation CD containing the entire Space Quest series), and early plans for a talkie version of the game were scrapped. According to then-Dynamix artist Sean Murphy, this was because Dynamix was in financial trouble at the time, and they were eager to release new games instead of working on "gold versions" of already-released games.

Copy protection
The game's copy protection involves the players being required to input five-digit target navigation coordinates in the warp drive (each coordinate represents a different planet or space station), from a chart in the printed manual.  Similar to Space Quest 4, there is a puzzle based around the copy protection system where an undocumented code needs to be discovered via in-game exploration.

Reception
According to Sierra On-Line, combined sales of the Space Quest series surpassed 1.2 million units by the end of March 1996.

Charles Ardai in Computer Gaming World stated that the game was both funny and suspenseful. He praised the "first-rate" graphics and sound, and described the dialogue and narration as "written with a dry wit and a sense of character that makes them a pleasure to read". Ardai concluded "I think even the most demanding Wilcophiles will be pleased".

References

External links

1993 video games
Adventure games
DOS games
DOS-only games
Point-and-click adventure games
ScummVM-supported games
Sierra Entertainment games
Space Quest
Games commercially released with DOSBox
Dynamix games
Single-player video games
Video games developed in the United States